San Ignacio Airfield  is a public paved airstrip located  northwest of San Ignacio, Municipality of Mulegé, Baja California Sur, Mexico. The airport is used solely for general aviation purposes. It is usually open during the whale watching season.

Accidents and incidents
On 8 December 1987, Douglas DC-3 CP-1059 of TASMI was damaged beyond economic repair in a take-off accident.

References

External links
SGM at World Aero Data.
SGM at The Airport Guide.
SGM at World Airport Codes.
SGM at Flyer Guide.

Airports in Baja California Sur
Mulegé Municipality